Adult rock and roll was a 24-hour music format produced by Dial Global. Its playlist was mostly active rock music (a mixture of classic and modern rock from artists such as Led Zeppelin, Pink Floyd, Lynyrd Skynyrd, Green Day, and The Rolling Stones, that mainly targeted listeners ages 32–45.

On December 29, 2008, "adult rock and roll" was merged with Jones Radio Networks' "rock classics" to make Dial Global's new format "classic rock".

Competing networks
The Classic Rock Experience by ABC Radio Networks

External links
Adult Rock and Roll - Info from Dial Global

Radio formats
Defunct radio networks in the United States
Radio stations disestablished in 2008
Defunct radio stations in the United States